Douglas Francis Hogg Baird (26 November 1935 – December 2002) was a Scottish professional footballer who played as a defender.

Baird was born in Falkirk. He began his career as an amateur with Armadale Thistle before joining Scottish Football League side Partick Thistle in 1955. He made 139 league appearances over the next six years, scoring once. In 1959, he won a cap for the Scottish under-23 side against Wales and represented the Scottish Football League against the League of Ireland. Baird moved to England in 1961 to play in the Football League for Nottingham Forest. In two years at the City Ground, he made 37 appearances and then signed for Plymouth Argyle. He made his debut in a 1–0 defeat at Sunderland in October 1963 and scored his first goal in a 1–0 win at Bury in October 1964. Baird played in 158 matches for Argyle, mostly as a full back,  and scored two goals. He joined non-league side Tavistock in 1968, where he spent two years, and then returned to Scotland to take up a player-coach role with Hamilton Academical. He died in December 2002.

Honours
Partick Thistle
Glasgow Cup: 1960–61

References

External links
Doug Baird at Greens on Screen

1935 births
2002 deaths
Footballers from Falkirk
Scottish footballers
Association football fullbacks
Armadale Thistle F.C. players
Partick Thistle F.C. players
Nottingham Forest F.C. players
Plymouth Argyle F.C. players
Tavistock A.F.C. players
Hamilton Academical F.C. players
Scottish Football League players
English Football League players
Scottish Football League representative players
Scotland under-23 international footballers